Colla Parte (subtitled Versioni per Violoncello Solo) is a solo album by the cellist Ernst Reijseger, recorded in 1997 and released on the Winter & Winter label.

Reception

In her review for AllMusic, Joslyn Layne wrote: "Calm, meditative, and gorgeous, Colla Parte is a solo cello recording from Ernst Reijseger, a musician internationally recognized not only for technique, but for unmatched creativity and improvisatory skills. Warm, intimate sound and an informal atmosphere... Filled with beauty, this Winter & Winter release is highly recommended for all fans of string music in general, as well as for Reijseger fans specifically".

In JazzTimes, Bill Shoemaker observed: "On this often sumptuous and occasionally wry solo program, Reijseger combines prodigious classical training, a dash of subversive wit, and an open-hearted, if idiosyncratic brio, to make Colla Parte a thoroughly engaging album from beginning to end. Reijseger creates a seamless, cloistered calm from not just space-soaking pieces built upon devices perfected in previous centuries, but also borderline dadaist techniques and a wide range of materials".

Track listing
All compositions by Ernst Reijseger except as indicated
 "Colla Parte" - 7:24
 "Ricercare" -	3:21
 "Gwidza" (Dollar Brand) - 5:06
 "Ritornello" - 3:26
 "Garbato con Sordina" - 3:28
 "Violoncello Bastardo" - 4:51
 "Toccata" - 2:54
 "Divertimento" - 3:31
 "Giocoso" - 1:58
 "Rosa" - 4:09
 "Passaggio" - 3:33
 "Cello di Buddha" - 7:28
 "La Madre di Tutti le Guerre" (Misha Mengelberg) - 3:27

Personnel
Ernst Reijseger - cello

References

Winter & Winter Records albums
Ernst Reijseger albums
1997 albums